Bev Nicholson may refer to:

Bev Nicholson (cricketer) (born 1975), English cricketer
Bev Hartigan (born 1967), English runner who competed as Bev Nicholson